Mqabba F.C. is a Maltese football club from Mqabba, a small village in south-western Malta. They were founded in 1957, and currently play in the Maltese Challenge League

History
During the First World War, some Maltese soldiers brought football to the village but only after the Second World War a club was first established. Mqabba Ramblers played their first game in 1953 and they joined the Maltese Amateur FA in 1955. At the end of the 1950s, two clubs from Mqabba, Mqabba Rovers and Mqabba Ħajduks played in the Maltese amateur league and they decided to merge and take the name of the latter.

Mqabba Ħajduks
The merger club played its first game in 1958 and four years later they were allowed to the Maltese Third Division by the Maltese FA. In 1978 they clinched promotion to the Second Division for the first time but they were relegated again in the year after that. In 1982 Ħajduks won promotion again and in 1984 they reached the First Division for the first time in their history.  They even went one better when they made their debut in the Maltese Premier League in 1985, but they only amassed a meagre 6 points to end up bottom of the table.

Following the re-organisation of the Maltese football leagues and the creation of the Premier League, they gained promotion to this division in 1990–1991, 1992–1993 and 2006–2007. Mqabba F.C. has the merit of being one of the smallest Maltese localities to feature in the highest level of Maltese football.

Current squad

References

External links
Official Web Site

 
Football clubs in Malta
1957 establishments in Malta